Life of Kylie is an American reality television series starring businesswoman and reality star Kylie Jenner and her best friend at the time, Jordyn Woods. The eight-part half-hour series premiered on August 6, 2017, on the E! cable network where Kylie talked about her life and the behind the scenes of her makeup line. The reality series was greenlit on April 10, 2017. On May 11, 2017, E! released the first promo video of the series.

Premise 

The series follows the life of fashion and make-up entrepreneur and reality television personality Kylie Jenner as she deals with running a business while maintaining a normal life and her close friendship with then best friend Jordyn Woods. It regularly featured members of her glam squad such as Ariel Tejada and Tokyo Stylez.

Episodes

Reception 
Time magazine said, "Life of Kylie is meant to show us the person behind the pout. Yet Jenner combines the self-obsession of a teenager with the reflexive crouch of someone who has learned to quash confessional impulses." Sadie Gennis of TV Guide commented that the show "is like its star: searching for purpose, but mostly very, very sad."

References

External links 
 
 

2017 American television series debuts
2017 American television series endings
2010s American reality television series
American television spin-offs
English-language television shows
E! original programming
Television shows related to the Kardashian–Jenner family
Keeping Up with the Kardashians
Reality television spin-offs
Television series by Bunim/Murray Productions
Kylie Jenner
Television series by Ryan Seacrest Productions